The Class ED500 was a single Bo-Bo wheel arrangement dual voltage AC/DC electric locomotive built experimentally by Hitachi in Japan in 1992. The design was derived from the DC Bo-Bo-Bo wheel arrangement Class EF200 also built by Hitachi, and was intended to replace Class ED75 locomotives on Tohoku Main Line freight services. The locomotive was loaned to JR Freight for testing until 1994, but the design was not selected for full production due to problems with restarting a single Bo-Bo wheel arrangement locomotive on the 25‰, 2.5%, gradients of the Tohoku Main Line and in the Seikan Tunnel. The Class EH500 articulated Bo-Bo+Bo-Bo design was ultimately chosen instead.

External appearance
Visually resembling the EF200 locomotives, the ED500 was finished in all-over black with red cab doors.

Classification

The ED500 classification for this locomotive type is explained below. As with previous locomotive designs, the prototype was numbered ED500-901.
 E: Electric locomotive
 D: Four driving axles
 500: AC/DC locomotive with AC motors

References

1500 V DC locomotives
20 kV AC locomotives
Electric locomotives of Japan
Bo-Bo locomotives
1067 mm gauge locomotives of Japan
Railway locomotives introduced in 1992
Individual locomotives of Japan
Multi-system locomotives